Yukon Gold was a Canadian reality television series produced by Paperny Entertainment that aired on History Television. The series followed four or five placer mining crews as they searched for gold over the four-month Yukon mining season.

The series was acquired in the United States by the National Geographic Channel and aired starting in 2013.

On June 1, 2017, Paperny Entertainment announced on the show's Twitter feed that after five seasons, Yukon Gold had "ended its run".

Summary
In the first season, miners Ken Foy, Al McGregor, Bernie Kreft, and Karl Knutson each led one of the crews.

Cam Johnson's group replaced Bernie Kreft's crew in the second season.

Nika Guilbault & Chris St. Jean's group replaced "Big Al" McGregor's crew in the third season.

In the fourth season, the Bernie Kreft and "Big Al" McGregor crews rejoined the show, alongside the operations of Ken Foy & Guillaume Brodeur, Karl Knutson, and Nika Guilbault & Chris St. Jean.

In the fifth season, the operations of Karl Knutson, Bernie Kreft, and Ken Foy & Guillaume Brodeur left the show, while the crews of "Big Al" McGregor and Nika Guilbault & Chris St. Jean returned. They were joined by the crews of Riley Gibson & Ed Long, and Andy Tai & Paul "P.J." Joseph.

Episodes

Seasons

Season 1 (2013)

Season 2 (2014)

Season 3 (2015)

Season 3 Special (2015)

Season 4 (2016)

Season 4 Special (2016)

Season 5 (2017)

Cast

Season 1

Season 2

Season 3

Season 4

Season 5

Locations

See also
 Gold Rush, another reality TV series with placer gold mining in the Klondike of the Yukon near Dawson City. "Big Al" McGregor makes a cameo appearance in Episode 5 of Season 13, entitled "Cheat Codes".
 Aussie Gold Hunters, another reality TV series with placer-style gold mining; set in the states of Western Australia, Victoria, and Queensland

References

External links
 

History (Canadian TV network) original programming
2010s Canadian reality television series
2013 Canadian television series debuts
2017 Canadian television series endings
Television shows set in Yukon
Television series by Corus Entertainment
Television series by Entertainment One